Statistics of Premier League of Bosnia and Herzegovina in the 2000–01 season.  It was contested by Bosniak and Croatian clubs.  Serbian clubs played in the 2000–01 First League of the Republika Srpska.

Overview
It was contested by 22 teams, and FK Željezničar Sarajevo won the championship. The season was the first season all team from Federation of Bosnia and Herzegovina, either Bosniaks and Croats played in the same league, unlike 2 stages league in previous seasons. Đerzelez conceded a record 198 goals in the league even to this day. At the end, six clubs were relegated and Željezničar striker Dželaludin Muharemović became top goalscorer with 31.

Clubs and stadiums

League standings

Results

References

Bosnia-Herzegovina - List of final tables (RSSSF)

See also
2000–01 First League of the Republika Srpska

Premier League of Bosnia and Herzegovina seasons
1
Bosnia